Alan John Atkins (born 14 October 1947) is an English heavy metal vocalist, best known for being the original lead vocalist and founder of Judas Priest.

Biography
With a wife and young daughter to support, Atkins was forced "to get a 9-to-5 job" in May 1973.

As of 2012, Atkins fronts the band Atkins/May Project, which also features guitarist Paul May. A press release dated 21 May 2011 stated that Atkins would be contributing session vocals for the heavy metal opera project, Lyraka. In 2013, Atkins recorded a solo album of his favorite songs written between his days in Judas Priest and his Holy Rage days.

Discography

Solo
 Judgement Day (1990)
 Dreams of Avalon (1991)
 Heavy Thoughts (1994) (released in 2003 with two bonus tracks)
 Victim of Changes (1998)
 Demon Deceiver (2007)
 Demon Deceiver... Plus (re-release with two bonus tracks, 2009)
 Reloaded (re-recorded "best of", featuring Ian Hill, Ralf Scheepers, Roy Z and more special guests, 2017)

Holy Rage
 Holy Rage (2010)

Atkins / May Project
 Serpents Kiss (2011)
 Valley of Shadows (2012)
 Empire of Destruction (2014)
 Anthology (compilation, 2015)
 The Final Cut (2020)

Albums (guest sessions)
Lyraka
Lyraka Volume 2 (not yet released)

References

External links
atkinsmayproject.com

Living people
English songwriters
English male singers
English rock singers
English heavy metal singers
Judas Priest members
People from West Bromwich
Musicians from Birmingham, West Midlands
1947 births